Teller is the name of:
 

 Wilhelm Abraham Teller (1734–1804), a German Protestant theologian
 Henry M. Teller (1830–1914), a US politician
 Leopold Teller (1844–1908), a Hungarian actor
 Charlotte Teller (1876–1953)
 Edward Teller (1908, Budapest – 2003), a Hungarian-US nuclear physicist known colloquially as "the father of the hydrogen bomb"
 Ludwig Teller (1911, Manhattan – 1965), a US Naval lieutenant and political figure

 Teller (magician) (born Raymond Joseph Teller, in 1948, Philadelphia), a US magician, a member of the comedy and magic duo "Penn and Teller"
 Janne Teller (born 1964), a Danish author
 Juergen Teller (born 1964), a German photographer
 Miles Teller (born 1987), an American actor
 Wyatt Teller (born 1994), American football player

See also
Teller (disambiguation)

German-language surnames
Germanic-language surnames
Jewish surnames
Yiddish-language surnames